Rishi Panchami is the fifth day, the next day after Ganesh Chaturthi day in Bhadrapad month of the Lunar calendar. It is a traditional worship of Sapta Rishi. The seven sages – Kashyapa, Atri, Bharadwaja, Vishvamitra, Gautama Maharishi, Jamadagni and Vashishtha. In some parts of Kerala the day is also observed as Vishwakarma Puja.

In this vrata, the people express respect, gratitude and remembrance of the great deeds of those ancient Rishis, who devoted their life for the welfare of the society. The fast is to be observed by women.

Rishi Panchami is also celebrated as Raksha Bandhan or “Rakhi festival” by some Dadheech Brahmins and also Agrawal and Maheshwari and Kayastha communities of Rajasthan. Sisters tie “Rakhi” or “Sacred Thread” and both brothers and sisters pray for the well being of each other and vow to protect each other.

Rituals
On Rishi Panchami, a ritual bath is taken in holy rivers, ponds or in other water masses. Lord Ganesh, Navagraha (nine planetary gods), Saptarshis (seven Sages) and Arundathi are worshipped on this day. The women offer the 'Prasad' to Gods and wash husbands' feet.

See also
 Ganesh Festival
 Hindu festivals
 Rishi

References

External links
 Rishi Panchami

Hindu festivals
Religious festivals in India
Hindu festivals in Nepal
August observances
September observances

 
Festivals in Maharashtra